

Lago dei Cavagnöö is a lake in the municipality of Bignasco, Ticino, Switzerland.

The arch dam Cavagnoli has a height 111 m. It was completed in 1968.

See also
List of lakes of Switzerland
List of mountain lakes of Switzerland

Lakes of Ticino
Reservoirs in Switzerland